Harold C. Helgeson (November 13, 1931 – May 28, 2007) was an American scientist and educator. A pioneering theoretical geochemist, he was a professor at the University of California, Berkeley.

Early life
Born in Minneapolis, Minnesota, he grew up in St. Paul. He received a B.S. in geology at Michigan State University in 1953.  Helgeson went to Harvard University for graduate school, supervised by Robert M. Garrels. Helgeson received his Ph.D. in 1962.

References
 Schulte, Mitch, 2000. A conversation with Harold Helgeson. The Geochemical News, January.
 Shock, Everett L. and Jan P. Amend, 2001. A tribute to Hal Helgeson on his 70th birthday.  Geochimica et Cosmochimica Acta, Vol. 65, page 3613.
 Sverjensky, Dimitri A. 2007, Obituary. Elements, August.

American geochemists
1931 births
2007 deaths
University of California, Berkeley faculty
People from Saint Paul, Minnesota
Harvard University alumni
Michigan State University alumni
Recipients of the V. M. Goldschmidt Award